Saul Greenberg is a computer scientist, a Faculty Professor and Professor Emeritus at the University of Calgary. He specializes in human-computer interaction and ubiquitous computing. He is an ACM Fellow.

Selected publications
Gutwin, Carl, and Saul Greenberg. "A descriptive framework of workspace awareness for real-time groupware." Computer Supported Cooperative Work (CSCW) 11.3-4 (2002): 411–446.
Tauscher, Linda, and Saul Greenberg. "How people revisit web pages: empirical findings and implications for the design of history systems." International Journal of Human-Computer Studies 47.1 (1997): 97–137.
Greenberg, Saul, and Chester Fitchett. "Phidgets: easy development of physical interfaces through physical widgets." Proceedings of the 14th annual ACM symposium on User interface software and technology. ACM, 2001.
Baecker, Ronald M., ed. Readings in Human-Computer Interaction: toward the year 2000. Elsevier, 2014.

References

External links

Year of birth missing (living people)
Living people
Canadian computer scientists
Academic staff of the University of Calgary
Fellows of the Association for Computing Machinery